Kirsten Sarah Callaghan (born 7 June 1991) is a British-Irish actress, writer, producer and singer-songwriter. Callaghan is best known for her lead role as swimmer Mercedes Gleitze in the upcoming biopic Vindication Swim.

Career 
Callaghan graduated from Rose Bruford College in 2015 and began her career on stage, writing and performing in one woman show L'amour Est Mort, based on the French folktale Bluebeard, which was chosen to be performed at the London Symposium Festival. In 2016, Callaghan was cast as Nöel Olivier in Nick Baldock's historical play Verge of Strife, and in the lead role of BBC and Royal Court Young Writer's graduate, Thomas Clancy's play, Pussy.

In 2019 Callaghan was cast as the lead role in the biopic Vindication Swim. The film, written and directed by Elliott Hasler, portrays the story of Mercedes Gleitze, who in 1927 became the first British woman to swim the English Channel. Callaghan spent three years training and filming for the swimming scenes, which were all filmed in the English Channel itself. Besides starring in the film, Callaghan also served as executive producer on the project, alongside producers Nicola Pearcey, Sally Humphreys, Douglas McJannet and Simon Hasler. Vindication Swim is due for release in 2022 and marks Callaghan's feature film debut.

Filmography

References 

British actresses
Irish actresses
British film producers
People from Brighton
1991 births
Living people